28th BSFC Awards
December 11, 2007

Best Film: 
No Country for Old Men

The 28th Boston Society of Film Critics Awards, honoring the best in filmmaking in 2007, were given on 11 December 2007.

Winners

Best Film:
No Country for Old Men
Runner-up: The Diving Bell and the Butterfly (Le scaphandre et le papillon)
Best Actor:
Frank Langella – Starting Out in the Evening
Runner-up: Daniel Day-Lewis – There Will Be Blood
Best Actress:
Marion Cotillard – La Vie en Rose (La môme)
Runner-up: Julie Christie – Away from Her
Best Supporting Actor:
Javier Bardem – No Country for Old Men
Runner-up: Ben Foster – 3:10 to Yuma and Alpha Dog
Best Supporting Actress:
Amy Ryan – Gone Baby Gone
Runner-up: Cate Blanchett – I'm Not There
Best Director:
Julian Schnabel – The Diving Bell and the Butterfly (Le scaphandre et le papillon)
Runner-up: Joel Coen and Ethan Coen – No Country for Old Men
Best Screenplay:
Brad Bird – Ratatouille
Runner-up: Ronald Harwood – The Diving Bell and the Butterfly (Le scaphandre et le papillon)
Best Cinematography:
Janusz Kamiński – The Diving Bell and the Butterfly (Le scaphandre et le papillon)
Runner-up: Roger Deakins – The Assassination of Jesse James by the Coward Robert Ford, In the Valley of Elah, and No Country for Old Men
Best Documentary:
Crazy Love
Runner-up: The King of Kong: A Fistful of Quarters
Best Foreign-Language Film:
The Diving Bell and the Butterfly (Le scaphandre et le papillon) • France/United States
Best New Filmmaker:
Ben Affleck – Gone Baby Gone
Runner-up: Tony Gilroy – Michael Clayton
Best Ensemble Cast:
Before the Devil Knows You're Dead
Runner-up: I'm Not There and Superbad (TIE)

External links
 Past Winners

References
 'No Country,' 'Diving Bell' are favorites of Boston film critics Boston Globe

2007
2007 film awards
2007 awards in the United States
2007 in Boston
December 2007 events in the United States